The Beast in the Cellar is a 1970 British horror film written and directed by James Kelley. The film was produced by Leander Films and Tigon British Film Productions, and starred Beryl Reid.

Plot
Soldiers stationed at a rural army base in Lancashire are being mauled to death in the surrounding woodland. The authorities suspect a wild cat, but sisters Joyce and Ellie Ballantyne, who live in a house nearby, fear that the soldiers are actually being murdered by their brother Steven (Dafydd Havard), who has been locked in their cellar for nearly 30 years.

Joyce and Ellie discover that Steven has dug a tunnel out of the cellar, allowing him to come and go as he pleases. They also find the body of one of the soldiers. As they fill in the tunnel, Joyce suffers a fall, forcing Ellie to complete the task alone. Ellie then buries Steven's victim near the house.

With Joyce now bedridden, Ellie realises that she cannot cope on her own and calls in the army and police. She tells them that Steven is her and Joyce's younger brother, born after their soldier father's return from the First World War. She adds that their father had been left shell-shocked by his experiences and was violent towards Steven. After their parents died, Joyce, not wanting Steven to end up like his father, resolved to prevent him from being called up at the start of the Second World War. To this end, she and Ellie drugged Steven and placed him in the cellar, thereafter lacing his water supply with sleeping pills to keep him under control. After being physically abused by his soldier father, then incarcerated for three decades by his sisters, Steven has developed a hatred of uniformed army men and regressed to the level of a savage.

Steven re-enters the house and lunges at Joyce, who is wearing their father's army overcoat and cap. He is fatally shot by one of the soldiers. Ellie realises that Steven did not mean to attack Joyce, but a framed bedside photograph of their father in uniform.

Cast

Release

The film was acquired for North American distribution by The Cannon Group Inc., and released theatrically at drive-ins in Philadelphia, Pennsylvania on December 1, 1971; it was paired as a double bill with The Blood on Satan's Claw (1971).

Home media
The film was released in Canada on DVD by Maple Pictures on 6 December 2005. It was later released in the United States by Trinity on 14 February 2006. In 2011, it was released twice by Allegro Corporation on 1 February, and 7 June respectively. The latter release it was part of the "Psycho Killers" 4 Movie Marathon. It was last released by Films Around The World Inc. on 11 November 2015.

Reception

The Beast in the Cellar received mostly negative reviews upon its release. 
Author and film critic Leonard Maltin gave the film 2/4 stars, stating that Reid's and Robson's performances brought the movie to an average level. TV Guide awarded the film 1/4 stars, stating that "The potentially interesting premise is undone by an extremely chatty script." On his website Fantastic Movie Musings and Ramblings, Dave Sindelar called the film "dull" and criticized the film's flaccid direction, endlessly talky sequences, lack of suspense, over focus on Reid and Robson's characters, and the design of the title monster. Charles Tatum from eFilmCritic gave the film 2/5 stars, offering similar criticism towards the film's overly long dull stretches, and lack of effectiveness during the attack sequences. Tatum did however commend Reid and Robson's performances. Andrew Smith from Popcorn Pictures awarded the film a score of 3/10, writing, "The Beast in the Cellar has an interesting approach to its subject matter with  characterisation of the two leads and  attempts to humanise them as much as it can. However this is horror after all and what we have is a pretty feeble but traditional British horror flick where you don’t see the monster until the very end and when you do, you realise you’ve been had for the last hour and a half."

References

External links
 
 
 
 The Beast in the Cellar at the TCM Movie Database

1970 films
1970 horror films
1970s serial killer films
British horror films
British serial killer films
1970s English-language films
Films about dysfunctional families
Films about siblings
Golan-Globus films
1970s British films